1986 is a Portuguese television series by RTP and produced by Hop!.

The series will portray, in a dramatic comedy record and from the point of view of high school adolescent students, their parents and teachers, one of the most striking moments of Portuguese democracy: the 1986 presidential election second round disputed between Diogo Freitas do Amaral and Mário Soares.

References 

Portuguese-language television shows
Portuguese comedy television series
2018 Portuguese television series debuts